Remembrance of Georgia (Sjećanje na Georgiju) is a Croatian film directed by Jakov Sedlar. It was released in 2002.

External links
 

2002 films
Croatian comedy-drama films
2000s Croatian-language films
Films directed by Jakov Sedlar